The Sibi Bhagnari or Sibi is the largest breed of Zebu cattle and originates from Sibi in Baluchistan, though also found elsewhere in Pakistan and also India. The name is derived from the town of Bhag which is found to the south of Sibi and Naari which is a river that flows through the breeding area. The areas consists of Talli, Khajjak, Kurak, Mithri and Bhag. Each year the giant cattle are shown at the Sibi Mela.

Description
The breed typically has a white or grey coloured body and is black around the neck and has a black tail switch. The head is medium-sized with a short strong neck, small ears, short horns, small dewlap, straight back, wide chest and a moderate sized hump.
It is still been debated whether the Sibi is the biggest cattle breed in the world. Bulls have been shown to compete with Chianina.

Sibi Bhagnari together with the smaller White Nukra are the only indicine cattle which give complete white coloured animals. (Brahman is more white-greyish.)

Environment

Farming
The cattle are mostly fed on dry fodder with sorghum used as green and grain. Other grains include wheat, barley, pearl millet which are fed to force weight gain. Other supplements include desi ghee, milk, yogurt, mustard oil, and occasionally eggs.

Cattle breeds
Cattle breeds originating in Pakistan

References 

Cattle breeds originating in India